Deshamanya Vajira Chitrasena (born 15 March 1932) is a veteran Sri Lankan traditional dancer, choreographer and teacher. Vajira is regarded as Sri Lanka's first prima ballerina. She is the first Sri Lankan woman to practice the traditional Kandyan dance which was traditionally performed only by men. Vajira is credited for creating brand for female style of Kandyan dancing and set the tone for women to become ritual dancers. She was married to Chitrasena who was a well known legendary dancer and dance guru. On 26 January 2020, she along with late professor Indra Dassanayake was conferred with the Padma Shri award which is one of the highest Indian civilian awards coinciding with the 71st Republic Day of India.

Biography 
Vajira was born on 15 March 1932 and was introduced to the arts at her very young age by her parents. She completed her primary and secondary education at the Methodist College, Colombo. She married her fellow dance partner late Chitrasena in 1951 at the age of 18. Her husband Chitrasena founded Chitrasena Dance Company in 1943.

Career 
Vajira's first domestic solo performance came in 1943 on stage at the Kalutara Town Hall. She and her husband Chitrasena co-founded the Chitrasena-Vajira Dance Foundation in 1944 and both toured India on several occasions between 1959 and 1998 to collaborate with artistes from different genres. Vajira and Chitrasena are known for their close bond with India and for their contributions in strengthening the ties between the two countries in the field of arts. She made her debut as soloist in the role of Prakriti in the ballet 'Chandali' in 1952. Her rise to stardom was coupled with unswerving discipline and dedication both as teacher, performer and choreographer, even as she illumined her husband's career.

She has also choreographed several acclaimed productions and has also been teaching dance to students for over 60 years. She has taught teaching to few prominent actresses Nilmini Tennakoon and Jeevarani Kurukulasuriya.

Honours 
The duo Vajira and Chitrasena were awarded the Eagle Award of Excellence in 2004 by the Eagle Insurance for their outstanding contributions to art. She was felicitated by the High Commission of India on her 81st birthday on 15 March 2013.

She was announced as an honorable recipient of the prestigious Padma Shri award for her achievement in arts in January 2020  and the award was given by Indian President Ram Nath Govind during the Padma Awards Investiture Ceremony which was held on 8 November 2021. It was also the first instance where Sri Lankan was honoured with the Padma Shri award since 2002. On 17 November 2021, she was felicitated in the Indian High Commission with the Padma Shri award in a ceremony which was held in the Temple Trees.

References 

1932 births
Living people
Sri Lankan female dancers
Dance teachers
Alumni of Methodist College, Colombo
Recipients of the Padma Shri in arts